A cabildo or ayuntamiento was a Spanish colonial, and early post-colonial, administrative council which governed a municipality. Cabildos were sometimes appointed, sometimes elected; but they were considered to be representative of all land-owning heads of household (vecinos). The colonial cabildo was essentially the same as the one developed in medieval Castile.

The cabildo was the legal representative of the municipality—and its vecinos—before the Crown, therefore it was among the first institutions established by the conquistadors themselves after, or even before, taking over an area.  For example, Hernán Cortés established La Villa Rica de la Vera Cruz to free himself from the authority of the Governor of Cuba.

The word cabildo has the same Latin root (capitulum) as the English word chapter, and in fact, is also the Spanish word for a cathedral chapter. Historically the term ayuntamiento was often preceded by the word excelentísimo (English: "most excellent") as a style of office, when referring to the council. This phrase is often abbreviated Exc.mo Ay.to

History

The Castilian cabildo has some similarities to the ancient Roman municipium and civitas—especially in the use of plural administrative officers and its control of the surrounding countryside, the territorium—but its evolution is a uniquely medieval development. With the collapse of the Western Roman Empire and the establishment of the Visigothic Kingdom, the ancient municipal government vanished. In many areas, seeking to escape from the political instability around them, people entrusted themselves to large landholders, exchanging their service for the landholder's protection, in a process that ultimately led to feudalism. (See also, Manorialism.) In areas where the old territoria survived, the Visigothic kings appointed a single officer, called either a comes or a iudice to replace the defunct municipia or civitates. After the Muslim conquest, the new rulers also appointed various judicial officers to manage the affairs of the cities. Qadis heard any cases that fell under the purview of Sharia law and sahibs oversaw the administration of the various other areas of urban life, such as the markets and the public order.

The cabildo proper began its slow evolution in the process of the Reconquista. As fortified areas grew into urban centers or older cities were incorporated into the expanding Christian kingdoms of Portugal, León and Castile, kings (and sometimes local lords) granted the cities various levels of self-rule and unique sets of laws (the fueros) and made them the administrative center of a large terminus or alfoz, which was analogous to the ancient territorium. In general, municipal governments often consisted of a council (consejo) open to all the property-owning adult males of the city and a nobleman appointed to represent the king and organize the defense of the city and terminus. By the 13th century, these open councils proved unwieldy and were replaced by a smaller body, the cabildo or ayuntamiento consisting of set number of regidores (usually twenty-four in the largest cities) elected by the property owners in the city. These new bodies took their permanent form by the end of the 14th century. As part of the same process, a municipal council (the consell) with different attributes and composition also evolved in the neighboring Kingdom of Aragon during this period.

Structure

In theory, every municipality in the Spanish colonies in the Americas and the Spanish Philippines had a cabildo. Municipalities were not just the cities but included the surrounding lands.  All lands were ultimately assigned to a municipality. Usually the cabildo made local laws and reported to the presidente (president) of the audiencia, who in turn reported to the viceroy. The cabildo had judicial, legislative and administrative duties.  For this reason it was often addressed with the formula, Consejo, Justicia y Regimiento (Council, Justice and Government).

The cabildo consisted of several types of officials.  There were four to twelve regidores, depending on the size and importance of the municipality.  Regidores, were not just deliberative officers, but all shared in the administration of the territory, dividing tasks among themselves. Initially the regidores were elected by all the heads of household. In the late Middle Ages, these elections often turned violent, with citizens forming bands to control elections and even resorting to murder. To minimize this kings began to appoint a certain number of, or even all of, the regidores in certain cities. By the modern era different cabildos had different mixes of elected and appointed regidores both on the Peninsula and overseas. Finally, to add another layer of control, the kings introduced corregidores to represent them directly and preside over the cabildos.  Although many municipalities lost their right to elect all or some of their regidores as time went on, cities and cabildos gained new power with the development of the Castilian and Leonese parliaments (the cortes) because cities had a right to representation in them.

In addition to the council members, the cabildo had one or two magistrates, the alcaldes, whom the regidores elected every January 1. Alcaldes served as judges of first instance in all criminal and civil cases and acted as presiding officers of the cabildo, unless there was a corregidor. In provincial capitals the first alcalde would fill in for incapacitated governors.  Other officers were the alférez real (royal standard-bearer), who had a vote in cabildo deliberations and would substitute the alcalde if the latter could not carry out the functions of his office; the alguacil mayor, who oversaw local law enforcement; the fiel ejecutor, who was the inspector of weights, measures and markets, in charge of the supplies of the city and oversaw municipal sanitation; the procurador or city attorney; and a scribe.

After the Bourbon Reforms, peninsulares were almost exclusively appointed to the positions of viceroy and bishop.  Other offices, such as oidores of the audiencia, corregidores (in the places where it continued to exist after the Bourbon Reforms) and intendants, also saw a rise in the proportion of peninsulares being appointed.  These last ones had been positions to which creoles once had easy access, especially after the approval of the sale of offices which began during the financial crisis at the end of the 16th century.  As a result of being shut out of these offices, creoles turned to the cabildos for political power.  Soon enough cabildos became the center of power for creoles, as evidenced in many of the clashes, usually with the peninsular-dominated audiencias, in the period leading up to the wars of independence. In the first decades of the national period, the traditional form of the cabildo was kept in several Spanish American nations, although they were eventually replaced by legislative municipal councils.

Currently existing

Because cabildos were the city government, the city administrative offices were often called the "cabildo".  These names are preserved in parts of Latin America, and even in New Orleans.

At present, cabildos exist only on the Canary Islands (cabildos insulares), one governing each island, and they are elected. Cabildos there resemble the consells insulars (island councils) of the Balearic Islands.

See also

 Ayuntamiento
 Corregidor
 Municipal council
 The Cabildo
 Crown of Castile
 Open cabildo
 Alcalde
 Alcalde ordinario
 Sargento mayor
 Regidor
 Síndico
 Corregimiento
 Teniente a guerra
 Santa Hermandad

References

Sources

 Din, Gilbert C. (1996) The New Orleans Cabildo: Colonial Louisiana's First City Government, 1769-1803 Louisiana State University Press, Baton Rouge, 
 Fisher, John (1969) "The Intendant System and the Cabildos of Peru, 1784-1810" The Hispanic American Historical Review 49(3):  pp. 430–453
 "Municipios", Diccionario de Historia de Venezuela. Caracas: Fundación Polar, 1997. 
 O'Callaghan, Joseph F. A History of Medieval Spain. Ithaca, Cornell University Press, 1975. 
 Pike, Fredrick B. (1960) "The Cabildo and Colonial Loyalty to Hapsburg Rulers" Journal of Inter-American Studies 2(4):  pp. 405–420
 Pike, Fredrick B. (1958) "The Municipality and the System of Checks and Balances in Spanish American Colonial Administration" The Americas 15(2):  pp. 139–158
 Meissner, Jochen (1993) Eine Elite im Umbruch: Der Stadtrat von Mexiko zwischen kolonialer Ordnung und unabhangigem Staat, 1761-1821 F. Steiner, Stuttgart, in German, (An Elite in the Breach: The Cabildos of Mexico between Colonial Order and the Unforgiving State)

External links
Encyclopædia Britannica Cabildo
El cabildo secular en Puerto Rico: Siglos XVI - XVIII, by Jorell A. Meléndez Badillo.

City councils
Spanish colonial governors and administrators
Subdivisions of the Spanish Empire
Colonial Mexico
Colonial Peru
New Spain